= Hanna Andersson (Salvation officer) =

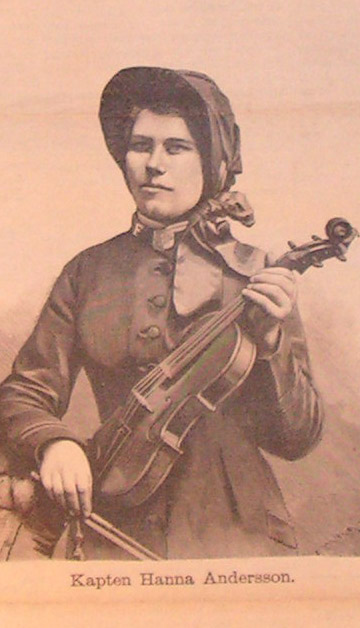

Hanna Andersson (1858-1938) was a Swedish member of The Salvation Army and a song and psalm writer.
